Back in Brazil is a song by English musician Paul McCartney, released by Capitol Records. The song was released as a promotional single on 16 September 2018, and is featured on McCartney's 2018 album Egypt Station.

Recording 
Rolling Stone called the song one of the weirdest tracks on the album, while noting that McCartney played over 9 instruments in the song. The song starts out with a lounge beat, but also included guitar, Wurlitzer piano, conga drums, and a triangle. The chorus of the song consists of McCartney shouting the word "Ichiban!," which is strange because it is a Japanese word and not Portuguese, the language widely spoken in Brazil. When asked why "Ichiban" was included in the song, McCartney said there was a "long answer" that he would give at a later date. McCartney's producer Greg Kurstin stated that "It was one of the trickier songs to get the feel of, to get the drum groove and all that stuff," and that McCartney "labored for hours working on the song." The song reached number 8 on the Brazilian iTunes chart.

Music video 
A music video for the song was released on 16 September 2018. The video follows a story of a beautiful Brazilian woman who invites her boyfriend to a Paul McCartney concert. While stuck at work, the boyfriend cannot go and they nearly break up. At the concert McCartney invites her on stage to dance, and because of that moment she forgives her boyfriend when he comes back to apologize. The concert sequence was recorded during the McCartney's performance in Salvador, 20 October 2017 for the One on One Tour.

Personnel 
 Paul McCartney – lead vocals, bass guitar, congas, acoustic guitar, electric guitar, Wurlitzer, harmonium, bird recording, triangle
 Greg Kurstin – wurlitzer, bass FX
 Abe Laboriel Jr. – drums, backing vocals
 Pedro Eustache – bamboo flute, duduk
 String quartet (Abbey Road)

Charts

References 

2018 singles
2018 songs
Songs written by Paul McCartney
Paul McCartney songs
Song recordings produced by Greg Kurstin